Up in the Sky is the second album of the Swiss folk rock band 77 Bombay Street. It was released in 2011 on Gadget Records as their first label release. The band had released its debut album Dead Bird independently self-financed and released in 2009.

Up in the Sky with all songs written by the four brothers and produced by Thomas Fessler reached number 3 on the Schweizer Hitparade, the official Swiss Albums chart. It resulted in four singles "47 Millionaires", "Long Way", the title track "Up in the Sky" (that made it to number 7 of the Swiss Singles Chart" and "I Love Lady Gaga".

Lead vocals on most tracks were performed by Matt Buchli. But lead vocals on the track "Miss You Girl" was by Joe Buchli and Simri-Ramon Buchli was the main performer on "I Love Lady Gaga". The album spent 115 weeks in the Swiss charts and went platinum.

Track listing

Charts

Weekly charts

Year-end charts

References

2011 albums
77 Bombay Street albums